Staten Island  is a borough of New York City, coextensive with Richmond County, in the U.S. state of New York. Located in the city's southwest portion, the borough is separated from New Jersey by the Arthur Kill and the Kill Van Kull and from the rest of New York by New York Bay.

A home to the Lenape indigenous people, the island was settled by Dutch colonists in the 17th century. It was one of the 12 original counties of New York state. Staten Island was consolidated with New York City in 1898. It was formally known as the Borough of Richmond until 1975, when its name was changed to Borough of Staten Island. Staten Island has sometimes been called "the forgotten borough" by inhabitants who feel neglected by the city government.

The North Shore—especially the neighborhoods of St. George, Tompkinsville, Clifton, and Stapleton—is the island's most urban area. It contains the designated St. George Historic District and the St. Paul's Avenue-Stapleton Heights Historic District, which feature large Victorian houses. The East Shore is home to the  FDR Boardwalk, the world's fourth-longest boardwalk. The South Shore, site of the 17th-century Dutch and French Huguenot settlement, developed rapidly beginning in the 1960s and 1970s and is now mostly suburban. The West Shore is the island's least populated and most industrial part.

Motor traffic can reach the borough from Brooklyn by the Verrazzano-Narrows Bridge and from New Jersey by the Outerbridge Crossing, Goethals Bridge and Bayonne Bridge. Staten Island has Metropolitan Transportation Authority (MTA) bus lines and an MTA rapid transit line, the Staten Island Railway, which runs from the ferry terminal at St. George to Tottenville. Staten Island is the only borough not connected to the New York City Subway system. The free Staten Island Ferry connects the borough to Manhattan across New York Harbor. It provides views of the Statue of Liberty, Ellis Island, and Lower Manhattan.

History

Native Americans
As in much of North America, human habitation appeared on the island fairly rapidly after the Wisconsin glaciation. Archaeologists have recovered tool evidence of Clovis culture activity dating from about 14,000 years ago. This evidence was first discovered in 1917 in the Charleston section of the island. Various Clovis artifacts have been discovered since then, on property owned by Mobil Oil.

The island was probably abandoned later, possibly because of the extirpation of large mammals on the island. Evidence of the first permanent Native American settlements and agriculture are thought to date from about 5,000 years ago, although early archaic habitation evidence has been found in multiple locations on the island.

Rossville points are distinct arrowheads that define a Native American cultural period from the Archaic period to the Early Woodland period, dating from about 1500 to 100 BC. They are named for the Rossville section of Staten Island, where they were first found near the old Rossville Post Office building.

At the time of European contact, the island was inhabited by the Raritan band of the Unami division of the Lenape. The area was part of the Lenape homeland known as Lenapehoking. The Lenape were later called the "Delaware" by the English colonists because they inhabited both shores of what the English named the Delaware River.

The island was laced with Native American foot trails, one of which followed the south side of the ridge near the course of present-day Richmond Road and Amboy Road. The Lenape did not live in fixed encampments but moved seasonally, using slash and burn agriculture. Shellfish was a staple of their diet, including the Eastern oyster (Crassostrea virginica) abundant in the waterways throughout the present-day New York City region. Evidence of their habitation can still be seen in shell middens along the shore in the Tottenville section, where oyster shells larger than 12 inches (305 mm) are sometimes found.

Burial Ridge, a Lenape burial ground on a bluff overlooking Raritan Bay in Tottenville, is the largest pre-European burial ground in New York City. Bodies have been reported unearthed at Burial Ridge from 1858 onward. After conducting independent research, which included unearthing bodies interred at the site, ethnologist and archaeologist George H. Pepper was contracted in 1895 to conduct paid archaeological research at Burial Ridge by the American Museum of Natural History. The burial ground today is unmarked and lies within Conference House Park.

European settlement
The first recorded European contact on the island was in 1520 by Italian explorer Giovanni da Verrazzano who sailed through The Narrows on the ship La Dauphine and anchored for one night.

Its name derived from the Staten Generaal, the parliament of the Republic of the Seven United Netherlands. From 1639 to 1655, Cornelis Melyn and David de Vries made three separate attempts to establish one there, but each time the settlement was destroyed in conflicts between the Dutch and the local tribe. Many French Huguenots had gone to the Netherlands as refugees from the religious wars in France, suffering persecution for their Protestant faith, and some joined the emigration to New Netherland. At one point nearly a third of the residents of the Island spoke French. The last vestige of Oude Dorp is the name of the present-day neighborhood of Old Town adjacent to Old Town Road.

Staten Island was not spared the bloodshed that culminated in Kieft's War. In the summer of 1641 and in 1642, Native American tribes laid waste to Old Town.

Richmond County
At the end of the Second Anglo-Dutch War in 1667, the Dutch ceded New Netherland to England in the Treaty of Breda, and the Dutch , anglicized as "Staten Island", became part of the new English colony of New York.

In 1670, the Native Americans ceded all claims to Staten Island to the English in a deed to Governor Francis Lovelace. In 1671, in order to encourage an expansion of the Dutch settlements, the English resurveyed  (which became known as 'Old Town') and expanded the lots along the shore to the south.

Captain Christopher Billopp, after years of distinguished service in the Royal Navy, came to America in 1674 along with the newly appointed royal governor of New York and the Jerseys Sir Edmund Andros, in charge of a company of infantry. According to one version of an oft-repeated but apocryphal tale, Captain Billopp's seamanship secured Staten Island to New York, rather than to New Jersey: the island would belong to New York if the captain could circumnavigate it in one day, which he did. This story is most likely untrue, due to conflicting information on the time Christopher Billopp took to complete the race and whether he received a personal prize or not. Mayor Michael Bloomberg perpetuated the myth by referring to it at a news conference in Brooklyn on February 20, 2007. Reliable historical documentation of the event is extremely sparse, however, and most historians conclude that it is entirely apocryphal. In 2007, The New York Times addressed the issue in a news article, which concluded that this event was heavily embellished over the years and almost certainly originated in local folklore. YouTube personality CGP Grey addressed the story of the Staten Island race and its historical discrepancies in a 2019 video, in which he concluded that Gabriel Disosway, a local chronicler in Staten Island, was responsible for originating the legend in the mid-1800s.

In 1683, the colony of New York was divided into ten counties. As part of this process, Staten Island, as well as several minor neighboring islands, was designated as Richmond County. The name derives from the title of Charles Lennox, 1st Duke of Richmond, an illegitimate son of King Charles II.

In 1687 and 1688, the English divided the island into four administrative divisions based on natural features: the  manorial estate of colonial governor Thomas Dongan in the northeastern hills known as the "Lordship or Manor of Cassiltown", along with the North, South, and West divisions. These divisions later evolved into the four towns of Castleton, Northfield, Southfield, and Westfield. In 1698, the population was 727.

The government granted land patents in rectangular blocks of 80 acres (320,000 m2), with the most desirable lands along the coastline and inland waterways. By 1708, the entire island had been divided up in this fashion, creating 166 small farms and two large manorial estates, the Dongan estate and a  parcel on the southwestern tip of the island belonging to Christopher Billopp.

The first county seat was established in New Dorp in what was called Stony Brook at the time. In 1729, the county seat was moved to the village of Richmond Town, located at the headwaters of the Fresh Kills near the center of the island. By 1771, the island's population had grown to 2,847.

18th century and the American Revolution

Staten Islanders were solidly supportive of the Crown, and the island played a significant role in the American Revolutionary War. General George Washington once called Islanders "our most inveterate enemies".

As support of independence spread throughout the colonies, residents of the island were so uninterested that no representatives were sent to the First Continental Congress, the only county in New York to not send anyone. This had economic repercussions in the months up through 1776, where New Jersey towns such as Elizabethport, Woodbridge, and Dover instituted boycotts on doing business with islanders.

On March 17, 1776, the British forces under Sir William Howe evacuated Boston and sailed for Halifax, Nova Scotia. From Halifax, Howe prepared to attack New York City, which then consisted entirely of the southern end of Manhattan Island. General George Washington led the entire Continental Army to New York City in anticipation of the British attack. Howe used the strategic location of Staten Island as a staging ground for the invasion.

Over 140 British ships arrived over the summer of 1776 and anchored off the shores of Staten Island at the entrance to New York Harbor. The British soldiers and Hessian mercenaries numbered about 30,000. Howe established his headquarters in New Dorp at the Rose and Crown Tavern, near the junction of present New Dorp Lane and Richmond Road. There the representatives of the British government reportedly received their first notification of the Declaration of Independence.

In August 1776, the British forces crossed the Narrows to Brooklyn and outflanked the American forces at the Battle of Long Island, resulting in the British control of the harbor and the capture of New York City shortly afterwards. Three weeks later, on September 11, 1776, Sir William's brother, Lord Howe, received a delegation of Americans consisting of Benjamin Franklin, Edward Rutledge, and John Adams at the Conference House on the southwestern tip of the island on the former estate of Christopher Billopp. The Americans refused a peace offer from Howe in exchange for withdrawing the Declaration of Independence, and the conference ended without an agreement.

On August 22, 1777, the Battle of Staten Island occurred between the British forces and several companies of the 2nd Canadian Regiment fighting alongside other American companies. The battle was inconclusive, though both sides surrendered over a hundred troops as prisoners. The Americans finally withdrew.

In early 1780, while the Kill Van Kull was frozen over, Lord Stirling led an unsuccessful Patriot raid from New Jersey on the western shore of Staten Island. It was repulsed in part by troops led by British Commander Francis Rawdon-Hastings, 1st Marquess of Hastings.

In June 1780, Wilhelm von Knyphausen, commander of Britain's Hessian auxiliaries, led many raids and a full assault into New Jersey from Staten Island with the aim of defeating George Washington and the Continental Army. Although the raids were successful in the Newark and Elizabeth areas, the advance was halted at Connecticut Farms (Union) and the Battle of Springfield.

British forces remained on Staten Island for the remainder of the war. Most Patriots fled after the British occupation, and the sentiment of those who remained was predominantly Loyalist. Even so, the islanders found the demands of supporting the troops to be heavy. The British army kept headquarters in neighborhoods such as Bulls Head. Many buildings and churches were destroyed for their materials, and the military's demand for resources resulted in an extensive deforestation by the end of the war. The British army again used the island as a staging ground for its final evacuation of New York City on December 5, 1783. After their departure, many Loyalist landowners, such as Christopher Billop, the family of Canadian historian Peter Fisher, John Dunn, who founded St. Andrews, New Brunswick, and Abraham Jones, fled to Canada, and their estates were subdivided and sold.

Staten Island was occupied by the British longer than any single part of the Thirteen Colonies.

19th century

On July 4, 1827, the end of slavery in New York state was celebrated at Swan Hotel, West Brighton. Rooms at the hotel were reserved months in advance as local abolitionists, including prominent free blacks, prepared for the festivities. Speeches, pageants, picnics, and fireworks marked the celebration, which lasted for two days.

In the early 19th century, New Jersey and New York disputed the location of their maritime boundary. The original charters were of no help because they were worded ambiguously. New York argued that the eastern edge of New Jersey was located at the Hudson River's shoreline during high tide, which would give New York control of all the docks and wharves on the Hudson River. New Jersey argued that the maritime boundary should be down the middle of the Hudson River and then continue out to the Atlantic Ocean, which would give New Jersey control of the docks and wharves as well as Staten Island. Vice President Martin Van Buren negotiated a compromise that established the maritime boundary in the middle of the Hudson River and gave Staten Island to New York. Ellis Island and Bedloe's Island, both uninhabited at the time, also became controlled by New Jersey.

From 1800 to 1858, Staten Island was the location of the largest quarantine facility in the United States.  Angry residents burned down the hospital compound in 1858 in a series of attacks known as the Staten Island Quarantine War.

In 1860, parts of Castleton and Southfield were made into a new town, Middletown. The Village of New Brighton in the town of Castleton was incorporated in 1866, and in 1872 the Village of New Brighton annexed all the remainder of the Town of Castleton and became coterminous with the town.

An 1887 movement to incorporate Staten Island as a city ended up resulting in nothing.

Consolidation with New York City

The towns of Staten Island were dissolved in 1898 with the consolidation of the City of Greater New York, as Richmond County became one of the five boroughs of the expanded city. Although consolidated into the City of Greater New York in 1898, the county sheriff of Staten Island maintained control of the jail system, unlike the other boroughs, which had gradually transferred control of the jails to the Department of Correction. The jail system was not transferred until January 1, 1942. Staten Island is the only borough without a New York City Department of Correction major detention center.

The construction of the Verrazzano-Narrows Bridge, along with the other three major Staten Island bridges, created a new way for commuters and tourists to travel from New Jersey to Brooklyn, Manhattan, and areas farther east on Long Island. The network of highways running between the bridges has effectively carved up many of Staten Island's old neighborhoods. The bridge opened many areas of the borough to residential and commercial development, especially in the central and southern parts of the borough, which had been largely undeveloped. Staten Island's population doubled from 221,991 in 1960 to 443,728 in 2000. Nevertheless, Staten Island remained less developed than the rest of the city. A New York Times article in 1972 stated that despite the borough having 333,000 residents, parts of the island still maintained a bucolic atmosphere with woods and marshes.

Throughout the 1980s, a movement to secede from the city steadily grew in popularity, notably championed by longtime New York state senator and former Republican Party mayoral nominee John J. Marchi. The campaign reached its peak during the mayoral term of David Dinkins (1990–1993), after the U.S. Supreme Court invalidated the New York City Board of Estimate, which had given equal representation to the five boroughs. Dinkins and the city government opposed a non-binding secession referendum, contending that the vote should not be permitted by the state unless the city issued a home rule message supporting it, which the city would not. Governor Mario Cuomo disagreed, and the vote went forward in 1993. Ultimately, 65% of Staten island residents voted to secede, through the approval of a new city charter making Staten Island an independent city, but implementation was blocked in the State Assembly.

In the 1980s, the United States Navy had a base on Staten Island called Naval Station New York. It had two sections: a Strategic Homeport in Stapleton and a larger section near Fort Wadsworth, where the Verrazzano-Narrows Bridge enters the island. The base was closed in 1994 through the Base Realignment and Closure process because of its small size and the expense of basing personnel there.

Fresh Kills and its tributaries are part of the largest tidal wetland ecosystem in the region. Its creeks and wetlands have been designated a Significant Coastal Fish and Wildlife Habitat by the New York State Department of Environmental Conservation. Opened along Fresh Kills as a "temporary landfill" in 1947, the Fresh Kills Landfill was a repository of trash for the city of New York. The landfill, once the world's largest man-made structure, was closed in 2001, but it was briefly reopened for the debris from Ground Zero following the September 11 attacks in 2001. It is being converted into a park. Plans for the park include a bird-nesting island, public roads, boardwalks, soccer and baseball fields, bridle paths, and a 5,000-seat stadium. Today, freshwater and tidal wetlands, fields, birch thickets, and a coastal oak maritime forest, as well as areas dominated by non-native plant species, are all within the boundaries of Fresh Kills.

Geology

During the Paleozoic Era, the tectonic plate containing the continent of Laurentia and the plate containing the continent of Gondwanaland were converging, the Iapetus Ocean that separated the two continents gradually closed, and the resulting collision between the plates formed the Appalachian Mountains. During the early stages of this mountain building known as the Taconic orogeny, a piece of ocean crust from the Iapetus Ocean broke off and became incorporated into the collision zone and now forms the oldest bedrock strata of Staten Island, the serpentinite.

This strata of the Lower Paleozoic (approximately 430 million years old) consists predominantly of the serpentine minerals, antigorite, chrysotile, and lizardite; it also contains asbestos and talc. At the end of the Paleozoic era (248 million years ago) all major continental masses were joined into the supercontinent of Pangaea.

The Palisades Sill has been designated a National Natural Landmark, being "the best example of a thick diabase sill in the United States". It underlies a portion of northwest Staten Island, with a visible outcropping in Travis, off Travis Road in the William T. Davis Wildlife Refuge. This is the same formation that appears in New Jersey and upstate New York along the Hudson River in Palisades Interstate Park. The sill extends southward beyond the cliffs in Jersey City beneath the Upper New York Harbor and resurfaces on Staten Island. The Palisades sill date from the Early Jurassic period, 192 to 186 million years ago.

Staten Island has been at the southern terminus of various periods of glaciation. The most recent, the Wisconsin glaciation, ended approximately 12,000 years ago. The accumulated rock and sediment deposited at the terminus of the glacier is known as the terminal moraine present along the central portion of the island. The evidence of these glacial periods is visible in the remaining wooded areas of Staten Island in the form of glacial erratics and kettle ponds.

At the retreat of the ice sheet, Staten Island was connected by land to Long Island, as the Narrows had not yet formed. Geologists' reckonings of the course of the Hudson River have placed it alternatively through the present course of the Raritan River, south of the island, or through present-day Flushing Bay and Jamaica Bay.

Geography

It is the third-smallest county in New York by land area and fourth-smallest by total area.

Although Staten Island is a borough of New York City, the island is topographically and geologically a part of New Jersey. Staten Island is separated from Long Island by the Narrows and from mainland New Jersey by the Arthur Kill and the Kill Van Kull. Staten Island is positioned at the center of New York Bight, a sharp bend in the shoreline between New Jersey and Long Island. The region is considered vulnerable to sea-level rise. On October 29, 2012, the island experienced severe damage and loss of life along with the destruction of many homes during Hurricane Sandy.

In addition to the main island, the borough and county also include several small uninhabited islands:
 The Isle of Meadows (at the mouth of Fresh Kills)
 Prall's Island (in the Arthur Kill)
 Shooters Island (in Newark Bay; part of it is in New Jersey)
 Swinburne Island (in Lower New York Bay)
 Hoffman Island (in Lower New York Bay)

The highest point on the island, the summit of Todt Hill, elevation 410 ft (125 m), is also the highest point in the five boroughs, as well as the highest point on the Atlantic coastal plain south of Great Blue Hill in Massachusetts and the highest point on the coast proper south of Maine's Camden Hills. Ward's Point in the neighborhood of Tottenville is the southernmost point in the state of New York.

Staten Island is the only borough in New York City that does not share a land border with another borough (Marble Hill in Manhattan is contiguous with the Bronx). The borough has a land border with Elizabeth and Bayonne, New Jersey, on uninhabited Shooters Island.

Wildlife
Staten Island is home to a large and diverse population of wildlife. Wildlife found on Staten Island include white-tailed deer (which have increased from a population of 24 in 2008 to 2,000 in 2017 due to a hunting ban and a lack of predators), as well as hundreds of species of birds including bald eagles, turkey, hawks, egrets and ring-necked pheasants. Staten Island is home to Atlantic horseshoe crabs, cottontail rabbits, opossums, raccoons, garter snakes, red-eared slider turtles, newts, spring peeper frogs, leopard frogs, fox, box turtles, skunks, northern snapping turtles and common snapping turtles

Parkland
Staten Island includes thousands of acres of federal, state, and local park land, including the "greenbelt" and "blue belt" park systems and the Gateway National Recreation Area, in addition to hundreds of acres of private wooded areas. The National Park Service maintains full-time wildland firefighters to patrol Staten Island sites in wildfire brush trucks.

The parks on Staten Island are managed by various state, federal and local agencies.

Five sites are part of the  Gateway National Recreation Area, managed by the U.S. National Park Service and patrolled by the United States Park Police:
Great Kills Park
Miller Field
Fort Wadsworth
Hoffman Island
Swinburne Island

Two New York State parks are managed by the New York State Office of Parks, Recreation and Historic Preservation:
Mount Loretto Unique Area
Clay Pit Ponds State Park Preserve
New York State Park Police officers patrol these parks and the surrounding streets.

 of State Forests, state wildlife management areas and Wetlands are managed by the New York State Department of Environmental Conservation:
Saint Francis Woodland
Butler Manor Woods
Arden Heights Woods
Todt Hill Woods
North Mount Loretto State Forest
Lemon Creek Tidal Wetland Wildlife Management Area
Blosers Wetland Wildlife Management Area
Goethal Pond Wetland
Bridge Creek Tidal Wetland
Old Place Creek Tidal Wetland
Oakwood Beach Wetland
Sharrots Shoreline Natural Resource Area
Sawmill Creek Wetland
The  of NYS Department of Environmental Conservation land throughout the island are patrolled by New York State Department of Environmental Conservation Police officers and one NYS DEC Forest Ranger, who has the dual task of law enforcement and fire suppression.

The New York City Department of Parks and Recreation manages 156 parks, including:
Conference House Park
Willowbrook Park
Graniteville Quarry Park
Silver Lake Park
Clove Lakes Park

The Fresh Kills Landfill was the world's largest landfill before closing in 2001, although it was temporarily reopened that year to receive debris from the September 11 attacks. The landfill is being redeveloped as Freshkills Park, an area devoted to restoring habitat. The park will become New York City's second largest public park when completed.

Adjacent counties

New Jersey 

 Hudson County — north and northeast
 Union County — northwest
 Middlesex County — west and southwest
 Monmouth County — south

New York 

 Kings County — east
 New York County — northeast

Demographics

As of the 2018 Estimate, 22.2% of residents are foreign born. 11.9% of residents live below the poverty line, the lowest of the five boroughs. Average per capita income was $33,922, while median household income was $76,244. There are 181,199 housing units, with a 69.5% owner occupancy rate, the highest of the five boroughs, as well as a median value of $460,200. There are 166,150 households, with 2.82 persons per household.

At the 2010 Census, there were 468,730 people living in Staten Island, which is an increase of 5.6% since the 2000 Census.
Staten Island is the only New York City borough with a non-Hispanic White majority. According to the 2010 Census, 64.0% of the population was non-Hispanic White, down from 79% in 1990, 10.6% Black or African American, 0.4% American Indian and Alaska Native, 7.5% Asian, 0.2% from some other race (non-Hispanic) and 2.6% of two or more races. 17.3% of Staten Island's population was of Hispanic or Latino origin (of any race).

In 2009, approximately 20.0% of the population was foreign born, and 1.8% of the populace was born in Puerto Rico, U.S. Island areas, or born abroad to American parents. Approximately 28.6% of the population over five years of age spoke a language other than English at home, and 27.3% of the population over twenty-five years of age had a bachelor's degree or higher.

According to the 2009 American Community Survey, the borough's population was 75.7% White (65.8% non-Hispanic White alone), 10.2% Black or African American (9.6% non-Hispanic Black or African American alone), 0.2% American Indian and Alaska Native, 7.4% Asian, 0.0% Native Hawaiian and Other Pacific Islander, 4.6% from Some other race, and 1.9% from Two or more races. Hispanics or Latinos of any race made up 15.9% of the population.

According to the survey, the top ten European ancestries were the following:
Italian: 33.7%
Irish: 14.2%
German: 5.7%
Russian: 3.8%
Polish: 3.4%
Albanian: 1.9%
English: 1.6%
Ukrainian: 1.3%
Norwegian: 1.0%
Greek: 1.0%
The borough has the highest proportion of Italian Americans of any county in the United States. There is a significant Jewish community mainly in the Willowbrook area.  Since the 2000 census, a large Russian community has been growing on Staten Island, particularly in the Rossville, South Beach, and Great Kills area. There is also a significant Polish community mainly in the South Beach and Midland Beach area and there is also a large Sri Lankan community on Staten Island, concentrated mainly on Victory Boulevard on the northeastern tip of Staten Island towards St. George. The Little Sri Lanka in the Tompkinsville neighborhood is one of the largest Sri Lankan communities outside of the country of Sri Lanka. The island houses more Liberians than anywhere outside Liberia, and has included three Liberian heads of state: David D. Kpormakpor, Ruth Perry, and George Weah. The borough is also home to a Chinanteco-speaking Indigenous Mexican American community.

Most of the borough's African American and Hispanic residents live north of the Staten Island Expressway, or Interstate 278. In terms of religion, the borough's population is largely Roman Catholic, peaking near 60% in the 2000 census. The Jewish community is slightly less numerous compared to other parts of the New York Metropolitan Area. There is a growing presence of Egyptian Copts, most of whom are members of the Coptic Orthodox Church.

Per the 2009 American Community Survey, the median income for a household was $55,039, and the median income for a family was $64,333. Males had a median income of $50,081 versus $35,914 for females. The per capita income for the borough was $23,905. About 7.9% of families and 10.0% of the population were below the poverty line, including 13.2% of those under age 18 and 9.9% of those age 65 or over.

If each borough were ranked as a separate city, Staten Island would be the 44th most-populous in the United States.

Languages
, 70.39% (306,310) of Staten Island residents age 5 and older spoke only English at home, while 10.02% (43,587) spoke Spanish, 3.14% (13,665) Russian, 3.11% (13,542) Italian, 2.39% (10,412) Chinese, 1.81% (7,867) other Indo-European languages, 1.38% (5,990) Arabic, 1.01% (4,390) Polish, 0.88% (3,812) Korean, 0.80% (3,500) Tagalog, 0.76% (3,308) other Asian languages, 0.62% (2,717) Urdu, 0.57% (2,479) other Indic languages, and African languages were spoken as a first language by 0.56% (2,458) of the population over the age of five. In total, 29.61% (128,827) of Staten Island's population age 5 and older spoke a first language other than English.

Government and politics

History

|}

Since New York City's consolidation in 1898, Staten Island has been governed by the New York City Charter that provides for a "strong" mayor-council system. The centralized New York City government is responsible for public education, correctional institutions, libraries, public safety, recreational facilities, sanitation, water supply, and welfare services on Staten Island.

The office of Borough president was created in the consolidation of 1898 to balance centralization with local authority. Each borough president had a powerful administrative role derived from having a vote on the New York City Board of Estimate, which was responsible for creating and approving the city's budget and proposals for land use.

The Office of Borough President became one focal point for opinions over the Vietnam War when former intelligence agent and peace activist Ed Murphy ran for office in 1973, sponsored by the Staten Island Democratic Association. Murphy's combat veteran status deflected traditional right-wing attacks on liberals, and the campaign facilitated the emergence of more liberal politics on Staten Island. In Board of Estimate of City of New York v. Morris (1989), the Supreme Court of the United States declared the Board of Estimate unconstitutional on the grounds that Brooklyn, the most populous borough, had no greater effective representation on the board than Staten Island, the least populous borough, a violation of the Fourteenth Amendment's Equal Protection Clause pursuant to the high court's 1964 "one man, one vote" decision.

Since 1990 the Borough president has acted as an advocate for the borough at the mayoral agencies, the City Council, the New York state government, and corporations. Staten Island's Borough President is Vito Fossella, a Republican who was elected in November 2021. Fossella is the only Republican borough president in New York City.

Staten Island flag

The Staten Island flag uses its old borough seal as a flag.

Politics
Staten Island's politics differ considerably from the rest of New York City. While the other four boroughs tend to be strongly Democratic, Staten Island is considered the most conservative, and the only one where Republicans usually do well. Although in 2005 44.7% of the borough's registered voters were registered Democrats and 30.6% were registered Republicans, the Republican Party holds a majority of local public offices. Staten Island is the base of New York City's Republican Party in citywide elections.

The main political divide in the borough is demarcated by the Staten Island Expressway; areas north of the Expressway tend to be more liberal while the south tends to be more conservative. Local party platforms center on affordable housing, education and law and order. Two out of Staten Island's three New York City Council members are Republicans, including conservative commentator Joe Borelli.

In national elections, Staten Island is a Republican-leaning county. Staten Island has voted for a Democratic presidential nominee only four times since 1940: in 1964, 1996, 2000, and 2012. In the 2004 presidential election, Republican George W. Bush received 56% of the vote in Staten Island, and Democrat John Kerry received 43%. By contrast, Kerry outpolled Bush in New York City's other four boroughs by a cumulative margin of 77% to 22%. In the 2008 presidential election, Republican John McCain won 52% of the vote in the borough to Democrat Barack Obama's 48%. In 2012, the borough flipped and was won by incumbent Democrat Barack Obama, who took 51% of the vote to Republican Mitt Romney's 48%. This made the borough one of the few parts of the country where Barack Obama gained as compared to 2008.

The Democratic Party's gains on the island in the 2010s proved ephemeral. In 2016, Republican Donald Trump carried Staten Island by 15.1%, the largest margin of any presidential candidate since 1988. With 56.1% of the island-wide vote, Trump became the first ever presidential candidate to receive over 100,000 votes out of Staten Island. The borough stayed Republican on election day 2020, delivering 56.9%—a record of more than 123,000 votes—to reelect incumbent President Donald Trump. In both elections, Staten Island was the only borough where Trump managed even 30 percent of the vote.

Each of the city's five counties (coterminous with each borough) has its own criminal court system and District Attorney, the chief public prosecutor who is directly elected by popular vote. Michael McMahon, a Conservative Democrat, is the current District Attorney.

Staten Island has three City Council members, the smallest number among the five boroughs. As of 2019, the island's city council delegation comprises two Republicans and one Democrat.

The borough also has three administrative districts, each served by a local Community Board. Community Boards are representative bodies that field complaints and serve as advocates for local residents. In the 2009 election for city offices, Staten Island elected its first black official, Debi Rose, who defeated the incumbent Democrat in the North Shore city council seat in a primary and then went on to win the general election.

Staten Island lies entirely within New York's 11th congressional district, which also includes part of southwestern Brooklyn. It is currently represented by a Republican, Nicole Malliotakis, who was elected in 2020. The 11th district had been represented by Democrat Max Rose, until Malliotakis defeated him by 58% to 42%. She won within her native Staten Island by 59.3% of the island's vote to Rose's 40.5%.

Local politics
Staten Island representation in the state assembly has two Democrats and two Republicans. The 62nd and 64th districts are represented by Republicans Michael Reilly and Michael Tannousis. The 62nd district  encompasses most of the south shore of the island. Both the 61st and 63rd districts have elected Democrats, Charles Fall and Michael J. Cusick. Staten Island is split between two state Senate districts. Most of the island used to be represented by Republican John J. Marchi, the longest-serving legislator in state history; but is now represented by Republican Andrew Lanza; while the North Shore belongs to the Brooklyn-based district of Democrat Diane Savino. In 2018, Matthew Titone, a Democrat who at the time was a member of the New York State Assembly for the 61st District, was elected Surrogate Judge for Richmond County, which covers all of Staten Island. He was succeeded by Charles Fall, also a Democrat, and the first African American elected to the Assembly from Staten Island.

Until 2009, Staten Island was included with Brooklyn as part of New York State's 2nd Judicial District. In that year, Staten Island secured Judicial Independence when a new law was signed, creating New York's 13th Judicial District. Since 2009, Staten Island voters have had the opportunity to elect 5 Justices to the New York State Supreme Court.

In New York City mayoral elections, Staten Island has traditionally been reliably Republican, having last voted Democratic for incumbent mayor Ed Koch in 1985. Staten Island's high Republican turnout is considered one of the major factors that helped Rudy Giuliani win in 1993 against incumbent Democratic mayor David Dinkins, and also Michael Bloomberg in 2001 against Mark J. Green.

Secession from New York City 
Secession from New York City has been a long time hot button issue on Staten Island. The "Greater City" exists as a result of actions of the New York State Legislature, and, as such, could be reduced in size by the same mechanism. A non-binding referendum was held in 1993 to consider whether it should be allowed to secede from the City. The New York City government and Mayor David Dinkins opposed the vote, contending that the referendum should not be permitted by the state unless the city issued a home rule message supporting it, which the city would not. Governor Mario Cuomo disagreed, and the vote went forward. Ultimately, 65% of Staten Island residents voted to secede, through the approval of a new city charter making Staten Island an independent city, but implementation was blocked in the State Assembly.

The Staten Island secession movement was defused by the election of Rudy Giuliani as New York City mayor on the same ballot. He had campaigned on the promise that Staten Island's grievances would be addressed. Giuliani's plurality in his narrow victory over Dinkins was aided by overwhelming support from Staten Island. Two of the borough's biggest demands were closing the Fresh Kills Landfill and making the Staten Island Ferry free, both of which were done. However, after the election of Bill de Blasio as Mayor in 2013 and the success of the Brexit vote in the United Kingdom in 2016, interest in secession was revived. In 2019, New York City councilman Joe Borelli announced his plan to introduce another set of bills to study the feasibility of secession.

Tourism 
In 2009, Borough president James Molinaro started a program to increase tourism on Staten Island. This program included a new website, a "Staten Island Attractions" video that is aired in both the Staten Island and the Manhattan Whitehall ferry terminals, as well as informational kiosks at the terminals, which supply printed information on Staten Island attractions, entertainment and restaurants.

Empire Outlets New York City, is a  retail complex constructed in the St. George neighborhood of Staten Island. Empire Outlets features 100 designer outlets. It is the first outlet mall in New York City. The mall is located next to the St. George Terminal, a major ferry, train, and bus hub.

Staten Island's Arts District is located in the North Shore region with many locations to see music and experience art. The Snug Harbor Cultural Center and Botanic Gardens (1000 Richmond Terrace) is home to The Staten Island Museum, The Staten Island Children's Museum, Heritage Farm, The Newhouse Gallery, The Chinese Scholar's Garden and the Great Hall. The St. George Theater is a historic landmark seated theater within walking distance from the ferry and it hosts many touring music artists. ArtSpace located at Navy Pier Court is run by the local arts council with revolving exhibits by local artists. Staten Island's only community radio station, Maker Park Radio, is located in the Stapleton neighborhood of Staten Island. The Alice Austin House is a historic landmark and photography gallery with a view of Manhattan. Although Staten Island lacks venues one can see many live music artists at local restaurants and spaces such as Flagship Brewery and Taproom, O'Henry's, The Hop Shoppe, Seppe Pizza Bar, The Burrito Bar, Adobe Blues and Hub17 on most weekends. For theater there is the Staten Island Shakesperean Theater, Illuminart Productions, Hemlock Theater, Sundog Theater, The Arts Center at the College of Staten Island, Seaview Playwrights Theater and The Little Victory Theater. 

Staten Island is known as the borough of parks because of its numerous parks. Some well known parks are Clove Lakes, Silver Lake, Greenbelt and High Rock. Moses Mountain, a hill known for its view of the borough, is the location where Robert Moses wanted to build the Richmond Parkway before protests defeated this arrangement. It is now a key point of Staten Island for tourists.

Culture

Local support for the arts

Artists and musicians have been moving to Staten Island's North Shore so they can be in close proximity to Manhattan but also have enough affordable space to live and work. Filmmakers, most of whom work independently, also play an important part in Staten Island's art scene, which has been recognized by the local government. Staten Island Arts (formerly The Council on the Arts and Humanities for Staten Island) is Staten Island's local arts council and helps support local artists and cultural organizations with regrants, workshops, folklife and arts-in-education programs, and advocacy. Conceived by the Staten Island Economic Development Corporation to introduce independent and international films to a broad and diverse audience, the Staten Island Film Festival (SIFF) held its first four-day festival in 2006.

Attractions
Historic Richmond Town is New York City's living history village and museum complex. Visitors can explore the diversity of the American experience, especially that of Staten Island and its neighboring communities, from the colonial period to the present. The village area occupies  of a  site with about 15 restored buildings, including homes, commercial and civic buildings, and a museum.

The island is home to the Staten Island Zoo. Zoo construction commenced in 1933 as part of the Federal Government's works program on an eight-acre (three-hectare) estate willed to New York City. It was opened on June 10, 1936, the first zoo in the U.S. specifically devoted to an educational mandate. In the late 1960s, the zoo maintained the most complete rattlesnake collection in the world with 39 varieties.

Museums

Snug Harbor Cultural Center, the Alice Austen House Museum, the Conference House, the Garibaldi–Meucci Museum, Historic Richmond Town, Jacques Marchais Museum of Tibetan Art, the Noble Maritime Collection, Sandy Ground Historical Museum, Staten Island Children's Museum, the Staten Island Museum, and the Staten Island Botanical Garden, home of the New York Chinese Scholar's Garden, can all be found on the island.

The National Lighthouse Museum recently undertook a major fundraising project and opened in 2012, and the Staten Island Museum (art, science, and history) plans to open a new branch in Snug Harbor by 2014.

The Seguine Mansion, also known as The Seguine-Burke Mansion, is located on Lemon Creek near the southern shore of Staten Island. The Greek Revival house is one of the few surviving examples of 19th century life on Staten Island. It is listed on the National Register of Historic Places and is a member of the Historic House Trust. It is an underappreciated attraction, harboring peacocks and an equestrian center.

Newspapers
Staten Island's local paper is The Staten Island Advance. The paper also has an affiliated website called .

In culture

Film
Movies filmed partially or wholly on Staten Island include:

Analyze This
The Astronaut's Wife
Bad Hurt
A Beautiful Mind
Big Daddy
Big Fan
Combat Shock
Cropsey
The Devil's Own
Donnie Brasco
Easy Money
Freedomland
The First Purge
Fur
The Godfather
Goodfellas
Grace Quigley
He Knows You're Alone
How to Lose a Guy in 10 Days 
The Irishman
The Jimmy Show
Joe the King
The Kindergarten Teacher
The King of Staten Island
Little Children
Neighbors
Nerve
The Other Guys
The Perils of Pauline (1914 serial)
Scent of a Woman
School of Rock
Shamus
Sisters
Sleepwalk With Me 
Sorry, Wrong Number
Splendor in the Grass
Staten Island
Staten Island Summer
Terrifier
The Toxic Avenger
Three Christs
Trainwreck
Two Family House
War of the Worlds
Wedding Daze
What We Do in the Shadows (TV series)  
Who's That Knocking at My Door
Working Girl
Wu-Tang Clan: An American Saga

Literature
World War One poet Alan Seeger, who fought with the French Foreign Legion and was killed in the Battle of the Somme and author of I Have a Rendezvous with Death grew up at St. Marks Place above the ferry stop on Staten Island in the last decade of the 19th century. His poem The Old Lowe House described property that would become Low Terrace, St. George.

Ki Longfellow was born on the island. Longfellow is the author of The Secret Magdalene and other books. Her Sam Russo historical detective noir novels are based in and around Stapleton.

Lois Lowry, the author of The Gossamer, The Giver, and many other books, attended school on Staten Island.

Writer Paul Zindel lived in Staten Island during his youth and based most of his teenage novels in the island.

George R. R. Martin based King's Landing on the view of Staten Island from his childhood home in Bayonne, New Jersey.

Music

Staten Island also has a local music scene. These venues in the North Shore are part of the art movement mentioned above. Local bands include many punk, ska, hardcore punk, indie, metal, and pop punk bands. Staten Island is known internationally for its hip hop culture from the critically acclaimed Wu-Tang Clan.

Musicians who were born or reside on Staten Island and groups that formed on Staten Island are found at List of people from Staten Island.

Television
The Spectrum cable news channel NY1 airs a weekly show called This Week on Staten Island, hosted by Anthony Pascale. The magazine-style show takes content from NY1's hourly newscasts called "Your Staten Island News Now".

A documentary series, A Walk Around Staten Island with David Hartman and Barry Lewis, premiered on public television station WNET on December 3, 2007. The hosts profile Staten Island culture and history, including major attractions such as the Staten Island Ferry, Historic Richmondtown, the Conference House, Snug Harbor Cultural Center and its Chinese Scholars Garden, and many more sites.

The Fox and WB sitcom Grounded for Life (2001–2005) was centered on a family of Irish heritage living on Staten Island.

All four cast members of truTV hidden camera reality TV show Impractical Jokers (2011–) hail from Staten Island. Joe Gatto, James "Murr" Murray, Brian "Q" Quinn, and Sal Vulcano are four friends who originally met while attending Monsignor Farrell High School, where they formed the improv comedy troupe The Tenderloins. Impractical Jokers features many references to Staten Island and filming often takes place in the borough. On February 6, 2023, the borough declared the first Monday of every February "Impractical Jokers Day" in honor of the show.

The FX comedy horror series What We Do in the Shadows (2019–) is centered on a group of vampires who live on Staten Island. The fact that they live on Staten Island and not more centrally in New York City is a common joke within the series, and their attempts to take over the entire borough have resulted in control of only five houses, according to the group.

Theater
The St. George Theatre serves as a cultural arts center, hosting educational programs, architectural tours, television and film shoots, concerts, comedy, Broadway touring companies, and small and large children's shows. Artists who have performed there include the B-52's, Jonas Brothers, Tony Bennett, and Don McLean. In 2012, the NBC musical drama Smash series filmed several scenes there.

The Ritz Theater in Port Richmond, a movie theater and vaudeville venue now a home-improvement showroom, once hosted the biggest names in rock and roll and show business. The theater was built by Isle Theatrical and opened in 1924. From 1970 to 1972, the theater had an arrangement with a Manhattan club that enabled them to bring top names, many of whom are now in the Rock and Roll Hall of Fame, to the location.

The Stadium Theatre was a 1,037-seat movie theater in Tottenville from 1927 to 1957. In January 1969 it re-opened as the New Stadium Theatre and was a rock-music venue, but by the 1970s it had become the site of a roller rink.

The Lane Theater in New Dorp opened on February 10, 1938, and was operated by Charles, Lewis and Elias Moses. The theater's interior has been landmarked since November 1988.  Starting in 1998, several concerts were hosted; and the theater briefly hosted "The EleMent" nightclub in 2001. After renovations were completed in summer 2009, Uncle Vinnie's Comedy Club opened there, operating until 2011. In 2012 the building became the home of the Crossroads Church.

Sports

Baseball 
The Staten Island Yankees played in the New York–Penn League from 1999 to 2020; the team was a Class-A Minor League affiliate of the New York Yankees before being eliminated during the restructuring of Minor League Baseball. The Yankees have stated they hope to assist in creating a new team for Staten Island in the independent Atlantic League.

The New York Metropolitans of the American Association played baseball on Staten Island from April 1886 through 1887. Erastus Wiman, the developer of St. George, brought the team to Staten Island at a stadium called the St. George Grounds, near the site of the present-day Staten Island Yankees' Richmond County Bank Ballpark and the Staten Island Ferry terminal.

Staten Island's Mid-Island Little League won the 1964 Little League World Series in Williamsport, Pennsylvania. Three Mid-Island Little League teams and six overall from Staten Island have reached the tournament since it started in 1947.  Staten Island Little League was the island's first Little League. Its "founding fathers"; Buddy Cusack, Jiggs Seaman, John Marino, Joe Darcy Sr., Joe "Babe" Darcy Jr., Ed Elliott, and Jim Darcy, built Hy Turkin Field (and additional fields) in Dongan Hills and have been inducted as a group into the Staten Island Sports Hall of Fame.

Basketball 
In 2015, the New York Post listed Staten Island's all-time basketball team as: Warren Fenley, Kyle McAlarney, Bill Murtha, Kevin O’Connor, Kenny Page. As of 2014, McAlarney was Staten Island's all-time high-school boys' scoring leader with 2,566 points.

Bowling 
Staten Island has been home to a number of national champions and world-class bowlers, including Mark Roth, Johnny Petraglia, Mary Ontek, Ben McNevich, Dom LaBargo, and Joseph Berardi. Roth, Petraglia and Berardi are in the Professional Bowlers Association (PBA) Hall of Fame.

Boxing 
The Daily News Golden Gloves Tournament started in 1927.  It is believed that Eppie Alonzo, who lived and trained at the Mount Loretto Home for Boys, is the first Staten Islander to win a Daily News Golden Gloves championship.  Alonzo won his division in 1949 and again in 1950.  Other Staten Islanders who have won a Daily News Golden Gloves championship include:  Gabe Perillo Jr. (1974), Kevin Rooney (1975), Al Tobe (1975), Johnny Verderosa (1975, 1976), Gary Stark Jr. (2000, 2001, 2002), Amanda Walsh (2008), Nafisa Umarova (2012), Chad Trabuscio (2012), Anthony Caramanno (2008, 2010, 2012).

College athletics 
The Wagner College Seahawks participate in NCAA Division I athletics and are a member of the Northeast Conference (NEC). National Basketball Association (NBA) coach P. J. Carlesimo coached the men's basketball team from 1976 to 1982. Terrance Bailey led NCAA Division I basketball in scoring as a junior in 1985–86. Rich Kotite, a former NFL player and coach, played tight end on Wagner's football team in the 1960s.

The College of Staten Island Dolphins participate in NCAA Division II athletics. The College of Staten Island Baseball Complex was the home of the Staten Island Yankees until 2001.

Cricket 
The Staten Island Cricket Club, founded in 1872, is the oldest continuously operating cricket club in the United States.

Football 
Staten Island had a National Football League (NFL) team, the Stapletons, also known as the Stapes. The team was based in Stapleton at Thompson Stadium, located on the current site of Berta A. Dreyfus Intermediate School 49 and the Stapleton Houses. They played in the league from 1929 to 1932, defeating the New York Giants twice and the Chicago Cardinals once. During the 1932 NFL season, the Stapletons, last in the NFL, played the eventual season champion Chicago Bears to a scoreless tie. Football Hall of Famer Ken Strong played for the Stapletons.

The following NFL players were born on Staten Island: Joe Andruzzi (1998–2006), Frank Ferrara (2001–2003), James Jenkins (1991–2000), David Richards (1988–1996), Joseph Ryan (1960), Lewis Sanders (2000–2007), Mike Siani (1972–1980), Frank Umont (1944–1948, then MLB umpire 1954–1973). NFL coaches Kevin Coyle and Lou Anarumo were also born on Staten Island.

The New York Predators of the semi-pro Regional American Football League have called Staten Island home since their inception in 1998. Owned by Bill Simo, they play most home games at St. Peter's H.S.

Golf 

Staten Island has four golf courses. La Tourette, Silver Lake, and South Shore are public, while Richmond County Country Club is the only private country club in New York City. The New York City Amateur is conducted annually at La Tourette Golf Course by the Staten Island Golf Association.

By some estimates, Staten Island has been the site of nearly a dozen golf courses. 
Harbour Hills Golf Links near Brighton, Lafayette, and Prospect Avenue in New Brighton opened in 1878 and is said to have conducted the island's first golf tournaments. In 1898, the club opened a new clubhouse opposite the Brighton Heights Inn along Castleton Avenue.  In 1904, the Brooklyn Daily Eagle Almanac reported that the club had 250 members and had been officially incorporated in 1896. Today most of the property is known as Goodhue Park and Allison Pond Park.
Clovena Club was in the vicinity of Clove Road and Victory Boulevard in 1897.
Staten Island Cricket and Base Ball Club had a course in Livingston and was a Charter member of the Metropolitan Golf Association. Besides the "baseball" name, it is also seen in journals at the time as Staten Island Country Club and Staten Island Cricket Club. As with other clubs making the transition from cricket to golf, the organization completed planning for what would become the Fox Hills Golf Course by identifying the  site and hiring an architect, but abandoned golf in 1899. 
Fox Hills Golf Course was one of the island's first true 18-hole courses. It opened in 1900 with over 200 members and had nearly 275 members by 1904. Fox Hills was semi-private, and attracted players from around the New York metropolitan area to its location in Clifton off Vanderbilt Avenue and Targee Street, where its clubhouse was one of the largest in the country. Prolific golf architect Tom Bendelow was selected to develop the course's original layout. Fox Hills's head professional, Scotsman Isaac Mackie, worked with Walter Travis in 1906 to revamp the golf course, and in 1928 Donald Ross made additional changes. Mackie played in at least 12 U.S. Opens from 1901 to 1921, and won the Eastern PGA Championship in 1908 at Fox Hills. From 1899 through 1926 the Staten Island Amateur was played annually at either Fox Hills or Richmond County Country Club. Like many private golf courses of that era, the Great Depression, as well as the growing number of public courses, contributed to the end of the club and Fox Hills closed in 1935.
Tysen Manor Golf Course, which was located on  site between Hylan Boulevard, Mill Road, New Dorp Lane, and Tysens Lane, was in existence from 1928 until 1936. The course was operated by Henry H. Nutt. Tavern on the Green, a restaurant that closed in 1976, was originally the golf course's clubhouse, near the location of the current post office on Hylan Boulevard.
Mayflower Country Club's golf course, designed by Devereux Emmet with Alfred H. Tull, was built on a  tract in Huguenot in 1928.  The club had designs for sporting facilities that included an indoor swimming pool and tennis courts, but member funding dried up once the stock market crashed in 1929. Regardless, Frank B. Sterner & Co. built the country club's clubhouse for $200,000 in 1930, and the first annual club championship was conducted in September 1931. New York City took over the site in 1966 and opened South Shore Golf Course in 1967.
Willowbrook State School Golf Course was a 9-hole layout on Forest Hill Road that opened in May 1945 and closed in the 1960s. The Metropolitan section of the Professional Golfers' Association of America (PGA) funded construction of the golf course at Halloran General Hospital in support of the U.S. Army and the war effort. Jones modeled the holes on what he thought were the great par-3s of the world and the unique course opened with complimentary reviews.

Bill Britton, a tournament winner on the PGA Tour, and Jim Albus, a multiple winner on the PGA Tour Champions, learned the game on Staten Island. Both won the prestigious Metropolitan Open. Albus was the head professional at La Tourette and a winner of the Senior Players Championship. Carolyn Cudone, raised on Staten Island, won a record five straight U.S. Senior Women's Amateur championships between 1968 and 1972, the most wins in a row by an individual in any United States Golf Association (USGA) championship. Frank Esposito, who learned the game on Staten Island, won the 2014 PGA Tour Champions National Qualifying Tournament. Sean Kelly, a regular golfer at Silver Lake Golf Course, took medalist honors at both the First and Second Stage of the 2018 Web.com Tour Qualifying Tournament.

Frank Hannigan was the USGA Executive Director and a TV golf analyst for ABC. He wrote for the Staten Island Advance as a golf columnist and was influential in bringing the US Open to Shinnecock Hills and Bethpage State Park, and promoted the creation of the New York City Amateur. Staten Island native Joe Moresco was President of the Metropolitan section of the PGA in 1969 and 1970, was the Section's Professional of the Year in 1971 and is a member of the PGA Metropolitan Section Hall of Fame, along with Jim Albus.

Ice hockey 
The following National Hockey League (NHL) players were born on Staten Island: Nick Fotiu, Kevin Labanc, Zach Aston-Reese, Joe Gambardella.

Motor sports 
From 1953 until 1972 stock car races were held weekly from May until October at a 1/5th-mile asphalt racetrack on Staten Island. The local dairy, owned by the Weissglass family, financed promoter Gabe Rispoli with $700 so he could make improvements to an existing sporting facility that became known as Weissglass Stadium.

There was a controversial plan by the International Speedway Corporation (ISC) to build an 82,000-seat race track on the island that would host National Association for Stock Car Auto Racing (NASCAR) races by 2010. The ISC abandoned the plan in 2006 citing financial concerns, and sold the  parcel in 2013.

Olympians 
The following Islanders have qualified to participate in the Olympic Games:
John Henry Lake (1900: Cycling, Bronze medal winner)
Abel Kiviat (1912: Athletics – 1500 Meters, Silver medal winner); World record holder
Frankie Genaro (1920: Boxing – Flyweight, Gold medal winner) 
Carl Borack (1972: Fencing – Men's team foil)
Marilyn King (1972: Athletics – Pentathlon; 1976: Athletics – Pentathlon; 1980: Athletics – Pentathlon)
Bill Jankunis (1976: Athletics – High Jump) 
Ray Rudolph (1980: Handball)
Dominick Minicucci (1988: Gymnastics; 1992: Gymnastics)
Robert Pipkins (1992: Luge; 1994: Luge)
Silvia Fontana (2002: Figure skating, 2006: Figure skating)
Marcus Browne (2012: Boxing – Light Heavyweight)
Gary di Silvestri (2014: Cross-Country Skiing – 15 kilometre classical)
Robby Andrews (2016: Athletics – 1500 Meters)
Krystal Lara (2020: Swimming – 100 metre backstroke; Swimming - 200 metre backstroke)

Elmer Ripley, a member of the Basketball Hall of Fame and Staten Island native, coached the Olympic basketball teams for Israel (1956) and Canada (1960).

Running
The New York City Marathon is a foot race run over a  course through the five boroughs of New York City.  The marathon starts each year on Staten Island.

The Ocean Breeze Track and Field Athletic Complex is a state-of-the-art indoor track and field facility in Ocean Breeze Park that is part of the South Beach section of Staten Island.  On November 19, 2015 the complex became the first facility in the United States to be recognized as a certified International Amateur Athletic Federation (IAAF) facility. A project under Mayor Bloomberg's Design Excellence initiative, the athletic complex was designed as part of the PlaNYC 110-acre Ocean Breeze regional park. The project, launched in 2007, encountered several delays, including a four-month setback due to Hurricane Sandy that exposed the vulnerability of generators, transformers, and electronic control rooms all of which had to be raised to avoid storm-surge flooding.

Tennis 
Tennis is said to have made its United States debut on Staten Island. The first American National championship was played at the Staten Island Cricket and Baseball Club (now known as the Staten Island Cricket Club) in September 1880. Tennis was introduced in Staten Island by Mary Ewing Outerbridge.

Robert "Bob" Duffield Wrenn four-time U.S. singles championship winner, and one of the first inductees in the International Tennis Hall of Fame was a tennis member at Richmond County Country Club. His brother George Wrenn and friend Arthur E. Foote were also members.

Education

Public schools
Non-charter public schools in the borough are managed by the New York City Department of Education, the largest public school system in the United States.

Public middle schools include Intermediate Schools 2, 7, 24, 27, 30, 34, 49, 51, 61, 72 and 75; and 861, a K–to–8 school; as well as part of the Petrides School (which runs from kindergarten through high school).

Public high schools include:
 College of Staten Island High School for International Studies
 Curtis High School
 Gaynor McCown Expeditionary Learning School
 New Dorp High School
Petrides High School
 Port Richmond High School
 Ralph R. McKee CTE High School
 Staten Island Technical High School
 Susan E. Wagner High School
 Tottenville High School

Private schools
 Staten Island Academy is the only independent private (non-public, non-religious) grade school on the island and is one of the oldest in the country.

Nondenominational Christian
 Gateway Academy (co-educational)

Catholic
 Monsignor Farrell High School (all-boys)
 Moore Catholic High School (co-educational)
 Notre Dame Academy (New York) (all-girls)
 St. Joseph by the Sea High School (co-educational)
 St. Joseph Hill Academy (all-girls)
 St. Peter's Boys High School (all-boys)

Islamic
 Miraj Islamic School (co-educational)

Jewish

Jewish Foundation School (co-educational)
Mesivtha Tifereth Jerusalem, Staten Island campus (all-boys)
Yeshiva Merkaz HaTorah (separate boys and girls)

Colleges and universities
 The College of Staten Island is one of the eleven senior colleges of the City University of New York (CUNY). The college offers associate's and bachelor's degrees, and also offers master's and doctoral-level study.
 Wagner College is a co-educational private liberal arts college with an enrollment of 2,000 undergraduates and 500 graduate students. 
St. John's University has a campus on Staten Island. It is a private, co-educational Roman Catholic university.

Transportation

Bridges
Staten Island is connected to New Jersey via three vehicular bridges and one railroad bridge. The Outerbridge Crossing to Perth Amboy, New Jersey, is at the southern end of New York State Route 440, and the Bayonne Bridge to Bayonne, New Jersey, is at the northern end of NY 440; both ends of NY 440 continue into New Jersey as Route 440. The Goethals Bridge, carrying Interstate 278, connects Elizabeth, New Jersey, onto the Staten Island Expressway. Just north of the Goethals, the Arthur Kill Vertical Lift Bridge carries freight between the northwest part of the island and Elizabeth, New Jersey. The Staten Island Expressway is connected to Brooklyn via the Verrazzano-Narrows Bridge, which carries I-278. Pedestrian links to Staten Island are available via a footpath on the Bayonne and Goethals Bridges.

From 1964 to 1977, Staten Island contained the longest vertical lift, steel arch, and suspension bridges in the world: the Arthur Kill Vertical Lift Bridge, Bayonne Bridge, and Verrazzano-Narrows Bridge, respectively. The Arthur Kill Bridge still holds the title for longest vertical lift bridge, while the Bayonne and Verrazzano bridges are now the 5th- and 14th-longest in their respective categories.

Roads
As of 2015, 82% of Staten Island households owned a car, the highest rate of any borough. Citywide, the rate was 45%. Unlike the other four boroughs, Staten Island has no large, numbered grid system for its roads. New Dorp's grid has a few numbered streets, but they do not intersect with any numbered avenues. Some neighborhoods organize their street names alphabetically. In addition to the island's highways (I-278, NY 440, Korean War Veterans Parkway), the borough's neighborhoods are connected by a number of heavily trafficked roads including Hylan Boulevard, the longest street in New York City.

Public transit
As of 2021, public transportation on the island is limited to:
New York City Department of Transportation (Staten Island Ferry)
MTA Regional Bus Operations (local service on Staten Island, including some service to Brooklyn; and express service to Manhattan)
Staten Island Railway service from St. George to Tottenville

Ferry
The Staten Island Ferry is the only transportation directly from Staten Island to Manhattan, roughly a 25-minute trip. The St. George Terminal, first opened in 1886, was rebuilt in 1951 and again in the 2000s. The ferry has been fare-free since 1997. The Staten Island Ferry transports over 60,000 passengers per day. It runs 24/7 every 15 to 20 minutes during weekday rush hours and every 30 minutes at other times. The ferries and both of its terminals are patrolled by a combination of the New York City Department of Transportation, New York City Police Department, United States Coast Guard and private security contractors.

An NYC Ferry route operates between St. George Terminal and Manhattan's West Side since August 2021, calling at Battery Park City/Vesey Street and terminating at Pier 79/Midtown West. This route is operated separately from the Staten Island Ferry and charges a fare.

Trains

The Staten Island Railway, currently the borough's only passenger railroad, traverses the island 24/7 from its northeastern tip to its southwestern tip. The Staten Island Railway opened in 1860 and was owned and operated by the Baltimore and Ohio Railroad (B&O) until July 1, 1971, when the line was bought by the Metropolitan Transportation Authority. The Staten Island Railway continued to have its own railway police, the Staten Island Rapid Transit Police, until 2005 when the 25-officer police force was consolidated into the Metropolitan Transportation Authority Police Department.

Staten Island is the only borough not served by the New York City Subway. A subway tunnel called the Staten Island Tunnel started construction in 1923, but was abandoned two years later; the completed portion lies dormant beneath Owl's Head Park in Brooklyn. Today, express bus service is provided by NYC Transit throughout Staten Island to Lower Manhattan, Union Square, and Midtown Manhattan.

A  right of way exists along the north shore of Staten Island. This North Shore Branch of the Staten Island Railway was built, owned, and operated by the B&O, which used it for passenger service until 1953. It then became a B&O freight line until the 1980s, when service was stopped. There have been proposals to revive the abandoned right-of-way for passenger service as a rail line or for use as bus rapid transit. There is also a proposal to build a West Shore Light Rail along New York State Route 440, running from the Staten Island Railway main line on the South Shore, to the Hudson–Bergen Light Rail in Bayonne, New Jersey. The South Beach Branch of the Staten Island Railway, which transported summer vacationers to South Beach, Staten Island, also ceased service in 1953.

Buses

MTA Regional Bus Operations provides local and limited bus service with over 30 lines throughout Staten Island. Most lines feed into the St. George Terminal in the northeastern corner of the borough. Three lines (the ) provide service over the Verrazzano Bridge to Bay Ridge, Brooklyn. The S79 SBS is the only Select Bus Service route in the borough. Beginning September 4, 2007, the MTA began offering bus service from Staten Island to Bayonne, New Jersey, over the Bayonne Bridge via the  limited-stop bus, allowing passengers to connect to the Hudson–Bergen Light Rail's 34th Street station, giving Staten Island residents a new route into Manhattan. Despite Staten Island's proximity to New Jersey, the S89 is the only route directly into New Jersey from Staten Island via public transportation.

Express bus service to Manhattan (via the Verrazzano Bridge or Goethals Bridge) is also available for a $6.75 fare each way. The  are the only express routes to run outside of weekday commuter hours.

Freight rail
Conrail Shared Assets Operations operates freight rail service for customers of CSX Transportation and the Norfolk Southern Railway via the Travis Branch, with a  intermodal on-dock rail facility on the West Shore of Staten Island, which connects to the National Rail System via the Arthur Kill Rail Bridge to New Jersey. In addition to the intermodal on-dock rail yard, the Conrail Staten Island Rail line also connects to the Sanitation Department's waste transfer station. Conrail railroad police officers patrol and respond to emergencies along the freight line.

Infrastructure

Hospitals
Staten Island is the only borough without a hospital operated by New York City. The Richmond University Medical Center and the Staten Island University Hospital are privately operated.

Jails
Staten Island is the only borough without a New York City Department of Correction major detention center. The Department of Corrections only maintains court holding jails at the three court buildings on Staten Island for inmates attending court. The various police agencies on Staten Island maintain in-house holding jails for post arrest detention prior to transfer to a corrections jail in another borough.

The Staten Island county sheriff operated a jail system on Staten Island until 1942, when the Staten Island jail system was transferred from the county sheriff's department to the New York City Department of Corrections and eventually closed. In 1976, the New York State Department of Correctional Services opened the Arthur Kill Correctional Facility of Staten Island, but the facility was closed in 2011.

Nicknames
Staten Island has acquired a number of nicknames over the decades, some connected to the notion that it is considered an afterthought by other New York City residents. The "Forgotten Borough" was first used nearly 100 years ago in a New York Times article that quoted a real estate executive. The phrase was more used during the secession movement of the 1990s, and came into greater use in the aftermath of Hurricane Sandy. Most recently people have been using "The Rock", more commonly associated with Alcatraz, as a nickname that first appeared in a New York Times article in 2007.

The hip-hop group Wu-Tang Clan, which originates from Staten Island, coined the nickname "Shaolin Land" (later simply Shaolin) for Staten Island as part of their slang.

See also

 List of people from Staten Island
 List of counties in New York
 List of Staten Island neighborhoods
National Register of Historic Places listings in Staten Island
 Staten Island Legal Services
 Staten Island Economic Development Corporation

Notes

References
 Kenneth T. Jackson (editor); The Encyclopedia of New York City; Yale University Press;  (1995).
 John Waldman; Heartbeats in the Muck;  The Lyons Press; (2000)
 Famous Staten Islanders page at the New York Public Library site:
 Staten Island gets its own Tourism Website
 
  John H. Betts The Minerals of New York City published in Rocks & Minerals magazine, Volume 84, No. 3 pages 204–252 (2009).

Further reading
Published in the 19th century
 
 
 
 
 
 
 
 
 chapter 20: Richmond, or Staten Island: Olden Times
 chapter 21: Richmond, or Staten Island: Present Century
 

Published in the 20th century

External links

 Staten Island – Office of the Borough President
 VisitStatenIsland.com – Official Tourism Website of Staten Island
 Staten Island Economic Development Corp. (SIEDC)

Other websites
 New York Public Library. Images related to Staten Island, various dates
 Staten Island Film Festival
 Staten Island Attractions Video
 Online Collections Database, Staten Island Historical Society
 StatenIsland.com, online magazine
 Old Staten Island, a comprehensive website about Staten Island's past
 SILive.com, online version of the Staten Island Advance daily newspaper

 
1683 establishments in the Province of New York
Boroughs of New York City
Islands of New York City
Islands of Staten Island
Italian-American culture in New York City
Populated coastal places in New York (state)
Populated places established in 1683